Mahesh Chandra Gupta is an Indian politician and a member of 18th Uttar Pradesh Assembly and 17th Legislative Assembly, Uttar Pradesh of India. He represents the Badaun (Assembly constituency) in Budaun district of Uttar Pradesh.

Political career
Mahesh Chandra Gupta contested Uttar Pradesh Assembly Election as Bharatiya Janata Party candidate and defeated Samajwadi Party with a margin of 16,467 votes. He has been appointed Minister of state in a Yogi Adityanath cabinet on 21 August 2019.

In the 2022 Uttar Pradesh Assembly Election Mahesh Chandra Gupta  won the Badaun seat by defeating Rais Ahmad of Samajwadi Party by a margin of 11179 votes.

Posts held

References

Uttar Pradesh MLAs 2017–2022
Uttar Pradesh MLAs 2022–2027
Living people
Bharatiya Janata Party politicians from Uttar Pradesh
1957 births